Satan's Slaves is a 2017 Indonesian gothic horror film written and directed by Joko Anwar. It is a loose remake-prequel to the 1980 film of the same name directed by Sisworo Gautama Putra based on a story by Subagio S. The plot follows a family who are haunted by the death of their mother, who dies after being bedridden for three years from a strange and debilitating illness.

Satan's Slaves is the highest-grossing Indonesian film of 2017 with 4.2 million admissions. The movie was released in a total of 42 countries including Malaysia, Singapore, Japan, Germany, and the United States.

A sequel, Satan's Slaves 2: Communion, was released in August 2022.

Plot
The film focuses on a struggling family living in the countryside in 1981: Mawarni, her husband Bahri, his mother Rahma, and the couple’s four children: 22-year-old Rini, 16-year-old Toni, 10-year-old Bondi, and six-year-old Ian, who is deaf. The family live amid financial hardship as Mawarni is ill and bedridden, and the royalties from her former singing career are long gone.

After Mawarni dies, the family are consoled by an ustad and his adult son Hendra, who recently moved to the neighbourhood. Bahri leaves to raise money for mortgage payments in town. At home, the children are haunted by a ghostly presence of Mawarni a while before Bondi and Rini find their grandmother Rahma dead inside the well. After finding an unsent letter on Rahma's desk to a man named Budiman, Rini and Hendra deliver it to him downtown to seek his help. Budiman, an occult writer, reveals that when Bahri was going to marry Mawarni, Rahma did not approve due to Mawarni’s career and indications of infertility. Budiman gives Rini his article about a fertility cult of Satan worshippers that target barren women who want to have children, with the caveat that the last child be surrendered voluntarily in seven years. They fear for the safety of Ian, who turns seven in three days. The next day, when delivering an urgent letter from Budiman to Rini, Hendra gets run over by a truck.

Bahri decides to move to town with his children. At night, members of the cult surround the house as a storm rages, but after Bahri tells them he is unwilling to give up Ian, they leave. The moving van fails to show up the next day, forcing them to stay another night, with the ustad keeping watch. Rini finally opens Budiman's letter, which explains that the last child shall be taken by the cult because they are Satan’s own child. It also explains that the cultists' arrival last night was simply to mark the house for the undead to pick up the child. Mawarni and several pocong appear, including Hendra, and kill the ustad. Ian, who just turns seven, cheerfully joins Mawarni and the pocong. Budiman arrives, evacuating Bahri and the other children.

One year later, Bahri and his family live in an apartment in town. A woman named Darminah comes over bringing food and later reports to her husband, who says they must make sure the family never leave. Darminah says “It’s time for another harvest” and her husband tells her to be patient.

Cast
 Tara Basro as Rini, Bahri's and Mawarni's 22-year-old daughter as well as sister to Toni, Bondi, and Ian
 Bront Palarae as Bahri Suwono, father to Rini, Toni, and Bondi as well as husband to Mawarni
 Ayu Laksmi as Mawarni Suwono, mother to Rini, Toni, Bondi, and Ian as well as wife to Bahri
 Endy Arfian as Toni, Bahri's and Mawarni's 16-year-old son as well as brother to Rini, Bondi, and Ian
 Nasar Anuz as Bondi, Bahri's and Mawarni's 10-year-old son as well as brother to Rini, Toni, and Ian
 Muhammad Adhiyat as Ian, Bahri's and Mawarni's mute 6-year-old son as well as brother to Rini, Toni, and Bondi
 Elly D. Luthan as Rahma Saidah, Rini's grandmother
 Arswendi Nasution as the ustad
 Dimas Aditya as Hendra, the ustad's son
 Egi Fedly as Budiman
 Fachri Albar as Batara
 Asmara Abigail as Darminah

Production

Development 
Director Joko Anwar had wanted to direct a remake of Pengabdi Setan ever since starting his film-making career, as the film had moved him to become a filmmaker. Rapi Films already had a remake of the film in the works with a different director attached, but Anwar managed to successfully pitch his own vision for the film to producer Sunil Samtani and was attached to the project soon after. Samtani granted the film a budget exceeding Rp 2 billion, far more than the average films produced by Rapi, in order to fully realize director Anwar's vision for production design.

Filming 
The production team took four months to search for a filming location to accurately represent the 1980's era in which the film takes place. The original filming location was located in Puncak Bogor, West Java, but the owner did not give them the proper permissions to film there. The team continued searching until they found an old house in the Pangalengan area which they redesigned to fit the aesthetic of the era.

Music

The film soundtrack is directed by Aghi Narottama, Tony Merle, and Bemby Gusti. Director Joko Anwar said that there are at least five songs that will be on the album plus 16 others so there will be a total of 21 tracks. Three of them were released on October 19, 2017 on Spotify and iTunes.

Release
Satan's Slaves premiered in Indonesia at the Epicentrum XXI, Kuningan, South Jakarta on September 20, 2017. The film was released in all Indonesian cinemas on September 28, 2017, and in Malaysia and Singapore on November 23, 2017. The film also to be released in 42 countries.

Reception

Box office
As of the end of 2017, Satan's Slaves has grossed Rp155 billion ($11.5 million) in Indonesia, and RM6 million ($1.5 million) in neighboring Malaysia, the latter country giving it its place as the highest grossing Indonesian film of all time beating Ada Apa Dengan Cinta? 2'''s record collective gross of RM4.6 million in 2016. In Mexico, it was released as Los Huerfanos and ranked at 6th place on Mexico Box Office on March 2–4, 2018; grossing $233,763 on its first weekend. As of September 2, 2018, it grossed $147,962 in Colombia. On April 3, 2018, it opened at No. 1 in Hong Kong. Back in its home country in Indonesia, Satan's Slaves became the best-selling Indonesian film of 2017 as well as the best-selling Indonesian horror and fourth best-selling Indonesian film of all time.

Critical response
On review aggregator Rotten Tomatoes, the film holds a 90% approval rating based on 21 reviews, with an average rating of 6.80/10.

John Lui of The Straits Times gave Pengabdi Setan 3.5 stars out of 5 and wrote that "the scares are carefully timed and spaced between plenty of character-building moments, showing the closeness of the family. These soap opera bits have aged the least well, but there is a low-key feel to these moments of filial piety that is thoroughly modern." Variety's Richard Kuipers wrote that the film has "high marks when it comes to the fundamental horror movie task of sending shivers up the spine and quickening the pulse." James Marsh of the South China Morning Post gave the film 3/5 stars, saying "a slow-burning tale that builds to a chaotic and somewhat muddled conclusion, Satan’s Slaves is bursting with ideas." Jonathan Barkan of Dread Central gave the film 3.5 stars out of 5, writing "without a doubt, Satan's Slaves is certainly creepy. This Indonesian occult horror remake gets it right". Writing for SciFiNow, Anton Bitel gave the film 4 out of 5 stars, saying "Mirrorings, repetitions and doppelgängers are fitting images for a film that is itself a reprise (with considerable variations) of Sisworo Gautama Putra’s 1980 film of the same name —  the very film that inspired Anwar to become a writer/director of genre films."

Awards and nominations

Sequel

In a 9 October 2017 interview with The Jakarta Post, director Anwar revealed that the film was a prequel to the original and that a sequel was planned, with the original film now being the third part in a trilogy. On 18 December 2017, executive producer Sunil Samtani said Rapi Films has been discussing the project plan of the sequel of Pengabdi Setan. The film is planned for release in 2019 and Joko Anwar will still be involved. On 23 March 2018, Samtani revealed that they had not come up with a script yet but filming would commence in 2019. He added that the stars of the existing film had expressed their interest but it's up to Anwar to decide on the actors.

The first trailer for the sequel, titled Satan's Slaves: Communion'', was released in February 2022, and the second trailer on June 16 the same year. The film was released theatrically on August 4, 2022.

See also 

 List of films featuring the deaf and hard of hearing
 Indonesian horror

References

External links
 
 

2017 films
2017 horror films
Citra Award winners
Indonesian supernatural horror films
2010s Indonesian-language films
Maya Award winners
2010s supernatural horror films
Horror film remakes
Remakes of Indonesian films
Films set in 1981
Films shot in Indonesia
Folk horror films
Films based on Indonesian myths and legends
Films directed by Joko Anwar
Religious horror films
Home invasions in film
Haunted house films
Films about death
Films about Satanism
Sign-language films
Films about deaf people